Tamirlan Ulubiyevich Dzhamalutdinov (born 28 July 1996) is a Russian football player. He plays as a central midfielder for Serbian club FK Novi Pazar.

Club career
He made his professional debut in the Russian Professional Football League for FC Anzhi-2 Makhachkala on 12 August 2014 in a game against FC Alania Vladikavkaz.

He made his debut for the main FC Anzhi Makhachkala squad on 27 May 2016 in a Russian Premier League relegation play-offs game against FC Volgar Astrakhan.

Career statistics

Club

Notes

References

External links
 

1996 births
Footballers from Moscow
Living people
Russian footballers
Association football midfielders
FC Anzhi Makhachkala players
FS METTA/Latvijas Universitāte players
FC Veles Moscow players
FK Novi Pazar players
Latvian Higher League players
Russian First League players
Russian Second League players
Serbian SuperLiga players
Russian expatriate footballers
Expatriate footballers in Latvia
Expatriate footballers in Serbia